Sword of the Empire is a 1964 Italian peplum film directed by Sergio Grieco.

Plot 

In AD 190 Rome is in terror. The barbarians have crossed the Alps leaving Rome under threat. Emperor Commodus is becoming increasingly hateful. Christians are being persecuted and the situation is becoming worse. Only one man can help. Consul Quintus Marcus is allied with legionnaires, gladiators and Christians and decides to generate an insurrection against the emperor. His fellow officers say they will fight with him but Rome needs Quintus Marcus, "the sword of the people!!!"

Cast
 Lang Jeffries  as Quintus Marcus, Roman Consul
 José Greci  as Nissia 
 Enzo Tarascio  as Emperor Commodus
 Howard Ross  as Leto (as Renato Rossini)
 Mila Stanic  as Marcia 
 Angela Angelucci  as Omah 
 Giuseppe Addobbati  as Pertinacius  
 Ignazio Leone  as Tigerio

Release
Sword of the Empire was released in Italy on 21 October 1964.

References

Footnotes

Sources

External links
 

1964 films
Peplum films
1960s Italian-language films
Films directed by Sergio Grieco
Films set in the Roman Empire
Films set in the 2nd century
Sword and sandal films
1960s Italian films